Gautham P. Krishna is an Indian actor who has appeared in lead roles of Malayalam as well as Tamil language films. He was introduced by director Vinayan with his 2010 surprise hit Yakshiyum Njanum.

Film career

Gautham was selected to play the lead role along with Meghana Raj by director Vinayan in his ghost flick Yakshiyum Njanum, an Onam release of 2010. The success of the film prompted Vinayan to offer another lead role to Gautham in Raghuvinte Swantham Rasiya, a 2011 release. Gautham also played important role in Again Kasargod Khader Bhai, the sequel of Kasarkode Khaderbai directed by Thulasidas.

After a small break, Gautham made his Tamil language debut with Manal Naharam directed by Oru Thalai Ragam Shankar, released in 2015. The film won him good reviews as an actor, moreover the film's Malayalam version was released as Sand City earning critical recognition.

In 2016, Gautham had a Malayalam release Poyi Maranju Parayaathe co-starring Vimala Raman and late Kalabhavan Mani. The film was earlier known as Amazon Turning Point. Vettai Naai is Gautham's new release.

Filmography

References

External links 
 

21st-century Indian male actors
Male actors in Tamil cinema
Living people
Male actors in Malayalam cinema
Indian male film actors
People from Changanassery
Year of birth missing (living people)